The 1952 St. Louis Cardinals season was the team's 71st season in St. Louis, Missouri and the 61st season in the National League. The Cardinals went 88–66 during the season and finished 3rd in the National League.

Following his acquisition during the offseason, Eddie Stanky was named player-manager and eased himself out of the lineup over the course of the season.

Offseason 
 December 11, 1951: Chuck Diering and Max Lanier were traded by the Cardinals to the New York Giants for Eddie Stanky.
 Prior to 1952 season: Bob Smith was signed as an amateur free agent by the Cardinals.

Regular season

Season standings

Record vs. opponents

Notable transactions 
 May 13, 1952: Eddie Kazak and Wally Westlake were traded by the Cardinals to the Cincinnati Reds for Dick Sisler and Virgil Stallcup.
 August 30, 1952: Tommy Glaviano was selected off waivers from the Cardinals by the Philadelphia Phillies.

Roster

Player stats

Batting

Starters by position 
Note: Pos = Position; G = Games played; AB = At bats; H = Hits; Avg. = Batting average; HR = Home runs; RBI = Runs batted in

Other batters 
Note: G = Games played; AB = At bats; H = Hits; Avg. = Batting average; HR = Home runs; RBI = Runs batted in

Pitching

Starting pitchers 
Note: G = Games pitched; IP = Innings pitched; W = Wins; L = Losses; ERA = Earned run average; SO = Strikeouts

Other pitchers 
Note: G = Games pitched; IP = Innings pitched; W = Wins; L = Losses; ERA = Earned run average; SO = Strikeouts

Relief pitchers 
Note: G = Games pitched; W = Wins; L = Losses; SV = Saves; ERA = Earned run average; SO = Strikeouts

Farm system 

LEAGUE CHAMPIONS: Rochester, Fresno, Albany

References

External links 
1952 St. Louis Cardinals at Baseball Reference
1952 St. Louis Cardinals team page at www.baseball-almanac.com

St. Louis Cardinals seasons
Saint Louis Cardinals season
1952 in sports in Missouri